Heterochorista is a genus of moths belonging to the subfamily Tortricinae of the family Tortricidae. The genus was erected by Alexey Diakonoff in 1952.

Species
Heterochorista acomata Horak, 1984
Heterochorista aperta (Diakonoff, 1953)
Heterochorista aura Horak, 1984
Heterochorista chrysonetha (Diakonoff, 1953)
Heterochorista classeyiana Horak, 1984
Heterochorista dispersa Diakonoff, 1952
Heterochorista fulgens Horak, 1984
Heterochorista inumbrata (Diakonoff, 1953)
Heterochorista melanopsygma (Diakonoff, 1953)
Heterochorista nitida Horak, 1984
Heterochorista ornata Horak, 1984
Heterochorista papuana (Diakonoff, 1952)
Heterochorista polysperma (Diakonoff, 1952)
Heterochorista prisca Horak, 1984
Heterochorista punctulana Horak, 1984
Heterochorista rostrata Horak, 1984
Heterochorista rufulimaculata Horak, 1984
Heterochorista signata Horak, 1984
Heterochorista spinosa Horak, 1984
Heterochorista trivialis Horak, 1984

See also
List of Tortricidae genera

References

 Diakonoff, A. (1952). Verhandelingen der Koninklijke Nederlandse Akademie van Wetenschappen. (2) 49 (1): 144.
 Brown, John W. (2005). World Catalogue of Insects. 5.

External links
Tortricid.net

Archipini
Tortricidae genera